The National Democracy (Democrazia Nazionale, DN) party was a spin-off of the Italian Social Movement, after the electoral defeat of 1976. It was born to pursue an agreement with the Christian Democracy, by moving from the neo-fascist ideology of the Italian Social Movement to a post-fascist moderate ideology.

The movement became a fully fledged party in February 1977 and ceased to exist in December 1979 after the very poor result of the 1979 election (0.6%).

Leadership
 Secretary: Ernesto De Marzio (1976–1978), Raffaele Delfino (1978–1979), Pietro Cerullo (1979)
 President:  Alfredo Covelli (1977–1979)

Electoral results

Political parties established in 1977
Political parties disestablished in 1979
Defunct political parties in Italy
1977 establishments in Italy
1979 disestablishments in Italy
Conservative parties in Italy
Defunct nationalist parties in Italy